Laguña Creek also formerly also known as Tyende Creek, is a stream in the Navajo and Apache Counties of Arizona. Chinle Creek is a tributary of San Juan River which is in turn a tributary of the Colorado River.

References

External links

Tributaries of the Colorado River in Arizona
Colorado Plateau
Rivers of Apache County, Arizona
Rivers of Navajo County, Arizona
Geography of the Navajo Nation
Old Spanish Trail (trade route)
Rivers of Arizona